Wem railway station serves the town of Wem in Shropshire, England. The station is 10¾ miles (17 km) north of Shrewsbury on the Welsh Marches Line to Crewe.

The station has two platforms. There is a level crossing at the north end of the station. This is now the only way for passengers to cross the line at the station, since the station footbridge was taken down. The level crossing is where Aston Street becomes Aston Road.

Over the weekend of 8–9 August 2015 the signal box which was located next to the level crossing was demolished. The barriers have been controlled remotely from the South Wales ROC at Cardiff since 2013 and the signal box was deemed obsolete.

There is also a small car park, which is accessed from Aston Street.

The signal box's Network Rail designation was "WM".

Facilities
It is unstaffed with a ticket machine on each platform, and no permanent buildings now remain aside from standard shelters on each platform.  Train running information is offered via CIS display screens, customer help points and timetable poster boards.  Step-free access is available via ramps to both platforms.

Services
Monday to Saturdays there is generally a two-hourly service from Wem southbound to Shrewsbury and northbound to Crewe (although a few longer distance services also call, including a pair to/from  via the Heart of Wales Line on weekdays only) with six trains southbound and five northbound on Sundays.

References

Further reading

External links 

Railway stations in Shropshire
DfT Category F1 stations
Former London and North Western Railway stations
Railway stations in Great Britain opened in 1858
Railway stations served by Transport for Wales Rail
Wem